Caloptilia sichuanensis is a moth of the family Gracillariidae. It is known from Sichuan, China.

References

sichuanensis
Moths of Asia
Moths described in 1990